Héctor Hurtado (born 11 September 1955) is an Ecuadorian weightlifter. He competed in the men's featherweight event at the 1984 Summer Olympics.

References

1955 births
Living people
Ecuadorian male weightlifters
Olympic weightlifters of Ecuador
Weightlifters at the 1984 Summer Olympics
Place of birth missing (living people)
20th-century Ecuadorian people